Parkkonen is a Finnish surname. Notable people with the surname include:

Patrik Parkkonen (born 1993), Finnish ice hockey player
Pete Parkkonen (drummer), Finnish drummer of band Zen Café
Pete Parkkonen (singer), Finnish singer and contestant in Finnish Idols

Finnish-language surnames